Muhammad Azri bin Abdul Ghani (born 30 April 1999) is a Malaysian professional footballer who plays as a goalkeeper for Malaysia Super League club Kuala Lumpur City.

Club career

Perak
On 3 January 2021, Azri signed a contract for Perak. On 25 April 2021, he made his league debut for the club in a 0–1 defeat to Melaka United.

International career
Azri has represented Malaysia at under-19 level. He played at the 2018 AFC U-19 Championship, which Malaysia hosted.

In August 2021, Azri was called up to the under-20 team for central training.

Career statistics

Club

Honours
Kuala Lumpur City
 AFC Cup runner-up: 2022

Malaysia U19
 AFF U-19 Youth Championship: 2018; runner-up: 2017

References

External links 
 

Living people
People from Kota Bharu
1999 births
Malaysian footballers
Association football goalkeepers
Perak F.C. players
Felda United F.C. players
Kedah Darul Aman F.C. players
Malaysia Super League players
Competitors at the 2021 Southeast Asian Games
Southeast Asian Games competitors for Malaysia